Jim Matthews (Leighton, NSW) was a rugby league footballer who played for the Canterbury Bulldogs, Eastern Suburbs clubs in the New South Wales Rugby League (NSWRL) competition.

Under new coach, Jack Gibson, Matthews was appointed captain and in a dramatic turn around led Easts to consecutive semi finals. At the end of the 1968 season he left Easts and returned to rural NSW where he played out the remainder of his career in the Illawarra competition.

Matthews played 73 matches for the Sydney Roosters and scored 133 points, coming from 9 tries, 49 goals and 4 field goals.

References

 
 https://www.rugbyleagueproject.org/players/jim-matthews/summary.html

1938 births
Living people
Australian rugby league players
Canterbury-Bankstown Bulldogs players
Rugby league players from New South Wales
Sydney Roosters captains
Sydney Roosters players